Asena is the name of a she-wolf associated with the Oghuz Turkic foundation myth. The ancestress of the Göktürks is also a she-wolf, mentioned yet unnamed in two different "Wolf Tales" recorded by Chinese chroniclers.
The legend of Asena tells of a young boy who survived a battle; a female wolf finds the injured child and nurses him back to health. The she-wolf, impregnated by the boy, escapes her enemies by crossing the Western Sea to a cave near the Qocho mountains and a city of the Tocharians, giving birth to ten half-wolf, half-human boys. Of these, Yizhi Nishidu becomes their leader and establishes the Ashina clan, which ruled over the Göktürk and other Turkic nomadic empires.

Modern era
With the rise of Turkish ethnic nationalism in the 1930s, the veneration of figures of Turkic Mythology, such as Bozkurt, Asena and Ergenekon was resurgent.

The Turkish Air Force's Boeing KC-135 Stratotanker tanker squadron is nicknamed ''Asena''.

Leader of the Turkish nationalist İYİ Parti Meral Akşener is nicknamed Asena.

See also 
 List of wolves
 Grey wolf (mythology)
 Tiele people, whose progenitors were a gray he-wolf and a Xiongnu princess 
 She-wolf (Roman mythology), a similar figure in the mythical foundation of Rome
 Romulus and Remus

References 

Göktürks
Turkic legendary creatures
Wolves in folklore, religion and mythology
Origin myths